The hydrodynamic radius of a macromolecule or colloid particle is .  The macromolecule or colloid particle is a collection of  subparticles.  This is done most commonly for polymers; the subparticles would then be the units of the polymer.   is defined by

The theoretical hydrodynamic radius  was originally an estimate by John Gamble Kirkwood of the Stokes radius of a polymer, and some sources still use hydrodynamic radius as a synonym for the Stokes radius.

Note that in biophysics, hydrodynamic radius refers to the Stokes radius, or commonly to the apparent Stokes radius obtained from size exclusion chromatography.

The theoretical hydrodynamic radius  arises in the study of the dynamic properties of polymers moving in a solvent.  It is often similar in magnitude to the radius of gyration.

Applications to aerosols 
The mobility of non-spherical aerosol particles can be described by the hydrodynamic radius. In the continuum limit, where the mean free path of the particle is negligible compared to a characteristic length scale of the particle, the hydrodynamic radius is defined as the radius that gives the same magnitude of the frictional force,  as that of a sphere with that radius, i.e.

This is analogous to the Stokes' radius, however this is untrue as the mean free path becomes comparable to the characteristic length scale of the particulate - a correction factor is introduced such that the friction is correct over the entire Knudsen regime. As is often the case, the Cunningham correction factor  is used, where:

,

where  were found by Millikan to be: 1.234, 0.414, and 0.876 respectively.

Notes

References
 Grosberg AY and Khokhlov AR. (1994) Statistical Physics of Macromolecules (translated by Atanov YA), AIP Press. 

Polymer physics